Tilden Santiago (13 June 1940 – 2 February 2022) was a Brazilian politician.

Life and career 
From 1991 until 2003, he served as a member of the Chamber of Deputies and later served as Ambassador of Brazil to Cuba from 2003 until 2006, after being appointed to that position by Luiz Inácio Lula da Silva.

Born in Brazil, Santiago died of respiratory complications from COVID-19 in Belo Horizonte, on 2 February 2022, at the age of 81.

References

1940 births
2022 deaths
Brazilian diplomats
Brazilian Socialist Party politicians
Brazilian trade unionists
Ambassadors of Brazil to Cuba
Members of the Chamber of Deputies (Brazil) from Minas Gerais
Workers' Party (Brazil) politicians
Deaths from the COVID-19 pandemic in Minas Gerais